American Electric was a short-lived American automobile manufacturer that built cars from 1913 to 1914.  It was an amalgamation of three electric car companies: Argo Electric, Borland Electric, and Broc Electric.

References

External links 

 Electric Vehicles Magazine - v. 3 no. 5–12 May-Dec. 1913

Brass Era vehicles
Defunct motor vehicle manufacturers of the United States
Electric vehicles introduced in the 20th century
Vehicle manufacturing companies established in 1913
American companies established in 1913